David Thomas Selby, OAM (born 29 May 1969)  is an Australian wheelchair basketball player. He was born in Sydney, New South Wales. He was part of the gold medal-winning Australia men's national wheelchair basketball team at the 1996 Summer Paralympics, for which he received a Medal of the Order of Australia. He was also part of the silver medal-winning Australia men's national wheelchair basketball team  at the 2004 Summer Paralympics.

References

Paralympic silver medalists for Australia
Wheelchair basketball players at the 2004 Summer Paralympics
Paralympic wheelchair basketball players of Australia
Paralympic gold medalists for Australia
Wheelchair category Paralympic competitors
Wheelchair basketball players at the 1996 Summer Paralympics
Recipients of the Medal of the Order of Australia
Living people
Medalists at the 1996 Summer Paralympics
Medalists at the 2004 Summer Paralympics
1965 births
Paralympic medalists in wheelchair basketball